Pennsauken Township is a township in Camden County, in the U.S. state of New Jersey, and a suburb of Philadelphia. As of the 2020 United States census, the township's population was 37,074, an increase of 1,189 (+3.3%) from the 2010 census count of 35,885, which in turn increased by 148 (+0.4%) from the 35,737 counted in the 2000 census.

The township is part of the South Jersey region of the state.

History
Pennsauken Township was incorporated as a township by an act of the New Jersey Legislature on February 18, 1892, from portions of the now-defunct Stockton Township.

The exact origin of the name Pennsauken is unclear, but it probably derives from the language of the Lenni Lenape Native Americans, who once occupied the area from "", the Lenape language term for tobacco pouch. Alternatively, the "Penn" in the township's name refers to William Penn, while "sauk" is a water inlet or outlet.

Pennsauken was home to America's first drive-in movie theater, created in 1933 with the opening of the Camden Drive-In in Pennsauken. It featured the comedy Wives Beware, released in the theaters as Two White Arms.

For 50 years, the township was the home to the Pennsauken Mart, a large multi-vendor indoor market, which was closed in January 2006 to make way for a sports arena/conference complex, however that did not materialize. In its place in 2018 a new high-end luxury apartment complex will be built-Haddon Point. Most of the vendors moved to the Grand Market Place in Willingboro Township.

Geography
According to the U.S. Census Bureau, the township had a total area of 12.13 square miles (31.41 km2), including 10.48 square miles (27.14 km2) of land and 1.65 square miles (4.27 km2) of water (13.59%).

Unincorporated communities, localities and place names located partially or completely within the township include Amon Heights, Bethel, Biedemon, Delair, Delair Station, Delaware Gardens, Dudley, East Pennsauken, Fish House, Hillcrest, Homesteadville, Jordantown, Merchantville Park, Morris, Morrisville, North Pennsville and Wellwood.

The township includes Petty's Island, a  island in the Delaware River although most of the island actually sits across a narrow strait from neighboring Camden. Once an oil storage and distribution facility, the island is now the site of a container cargo shipping operation and nesting bald eagles. Petty's Island is currently in the process of being turned over to the State of New Jersey by Citgo to be transformed to a new state park and nature center .

Pennsauken borders Philadelphia, Pennsylvania. The two municipalities are connected across the Delaware River by the Betsy Ross Bridge which is owned and operated by the Delaware River Port Authority. In New Jersey, Pennsauken borders Camden, Cherry Hill, Collingswood and Merchantville in Camden County, and Cinnaminson Township, Maple Shade Township and Palmyra in Burlington County.

Demographics

2010 census

The Census Bureau's 2006–2010 American Community Survey showed that (in 2010 inflation-adjusted dollars) median household income was $57,241 (with a margin of error of +/− $3,957) and the median family income was $65,910 (+/− $3,272). Males had a median income of $47,651 (+/− $3,101) versus $39,229 (+/− $2,035) for females. The per capita income for the borough was $26,048 (+/− $1,438). About 6.4% of families and 8.9% of the population were below the poverty line, including 12.4% of those under age 18 and 6.7% of those age 65 or over.

2000 census
As of the 2000 United States census, there were 35,737 people, 12,389 households, and 9,093 families residing in the township. The racial makeup of the township was 60.10% White, 24.18% African American, 0.35% Native American, 4.58% Asian, 0.02% Pacific Islander, 8.27% from other races, and 2.51% from two or more races. Hispanic or Latino of any race were 14.34% of the population.

There were 12,389 households, out of which 36.5% had children under the age of 18 living with them, 51.6% were married couples living together, 16.2% had a female householder with no husband present, and 26.6% were non-families. 23.1% of all households were made up of individuals, and 10.4% had someone living alone who was 65 years of age or older. The average household size was 2.83 and the average family size was 3.34.

In the township, the age distribution of the population shows 27.5% under the age of 18, 7.6% from 18 to 24, 29.7% from 25 to 44, 21.1% from 45 to 64, and 14.2% who were 65 years of age or older. The median age was 36 years. For every 100 females, there were 91.9 males. For every 100 females age 18 and over, there were 86.8 males.

The median income for a household in the township was $47,538, and the median income for a family was $52,760. Males had a median income of $37,652 versus $30,100 for females. The per capita income for the township was $19,004. About 6.1% of families and 8.0% of the population were below the poverty line, including 10.1% of those under age 18 and 8.0% of those age 65 or over.

Economy
Pennsauken is home to a large industrial park that includes a Pepsi bottling plant and J & J Snack Foods.

Government

Local government
Pennsauken Township is governed under the Township form of New Jersey municipal government, one of 141 municipalities (of the 564) statewide that use this form, the second-most commonly used form of government in the state. The Township Committee is comprised of five members, who are elected directly by the voters at-large in partisan elections to serve three-year terms of office on a staggered basis, with either one or two seats coming up for election each year as part of the November general election in a three-year cycle. At an annual reorganization meeting, the Township Committee selects one of its members to serve as Mayor and another as Deputy Mayor, each serving a one-year term.

, members of the Pennsauken Township Committee are Mayor Jessica Jarbou-Rafeh (D, term of office on committee ends December 31, 2024, as mayor ends 2022), Deputy Mayor Nicole "Nikki" Roberts (D, term on committee and as deputy mayor ends 2022; elected to an unexpired term), Marco DiBattista (D, 2024), Vince Martinez (D, 2023) and Patrick Olivo (D, 2023; elected to an unexpired term).

During the 2022 reorganization meeting of Pennsauken Township Committee, Jessica Rafeh was sworn in as the town’s first Hispanic and Middle Eastern mayor; Nicole Roberts became the town’s first African American female deputy mayor; and the pair represent the first time Pennsauken will have an all-female led governing body

In December 2021, the Township Committee selected Nicole Roberts from a list of three candidates submitted by the Democratic municipal committee to fill the seat expiring in December 2021 that was vacated by Almar Dyer when he took office on the Camden County Board of County Commissioners.

In June 2021, Patrick Olivo was appointed to fill the seat expiring in December 2023 that had been held by Tim Killion until he stepped down from office to become the township's administrator.

Federal, state and county representation
Pennsauken Township is located in the 1st Congressional District and is part of New Jersey's 6th state legislative district. Prior to the 2011 reapportionment following the 2010 Census, Pennsauken Township had been in the 7th state legislative district.

Politics
As of March 2011, there were a total of 22,704 registered voters in Pennsauken Township, of which 9,989 (44.0%) were registered as Democrats, 2,263 (10.0%) were registered as Republicans and 10,443 (46.0%) were registered as Unaffiliated. There were 9 voters registered as Libertarians or Greens.

In the 2012 presidential election, Democrat Barack Obama received 78.4% of the vote (12,200 cast), ahead of Republican Mitt Romney with 20.8% (3,233 votes), and other candidates with 0.9% (135 votes), among the 15,722 ballots cast by the township's 24,313 registered voters (154 ballots were spoiled), for a turnout of 64.7%. In the 2008 presidential election, Democrat Barack Obama received 74.0% of the vote (12,195 cast), ahead of Republican John McCain, who received around 23.2% (3,824 votes), with 16,485 ballots cast among the township's 21,669 registered voters, for a turnout of 76.1%. In the 2004 presidential election, Democrat John Kerry received 63.7% of the vote (9,384 ballots cast), outpolling Republican George W. Bush, who received around 32.1% (4,720 votes), with 14,726 ballots cast among the township's 20,846 registered voters, for a turnout percentage of 70.6.

In the 2013 gubernatorial election, Democrat Barbara Buono received 51.4% of the vote (414 cast), ahead of Republican Chris Christie with 44.3% (357 votes), and other candidates with 4.2% (34 votes), among the 915 ballots cast by the borough's 2,793 registered voters (110 ballots were spoiled), for a turnout of 32.8%. In the 2009 gubernatorial election, Democrat Jon Corzine received 64.% of the vote (5,594 ballots cast), ahead of both Republican Chris Christie with 28.8% (2,517 votes) and Independent Chris Daggett with 4.2% (364 votes), with 8,745 ballots cast among the township's 22,497 registered voters, yielding a 38.9% turnout.

Education
The Pennsauken Public Schools serve public school students in pre-kindergarten through twelfth grade. As of the 2018–19 school year, the district, comprised of nine schools, had an enrollment of 4,785 students and 395.5 classroom teachers (on an FTE basis), for a student–teacher ratio of 12.1:1. Schools in the district (with 2018–19 enrollment data from the National Center for Education Statistics) are 
Baldwin Early Childhood Learning Center (103 students in grade Pre-K), 
Carson Elementary School (300; Pre-K–4), 
Delair Elementary School (386; Pre-K–4), 
George B. Fine Elementary School (249; Pre-K–4), 
Benjamin Franklin Elementary School (361; K–4), 
Pennsauken Intermediate School (702; 5–6), 
Howard M. Phifer Middle School (1,151; 7–8), 
Alfred E. Burling High School (now 6–12; was 108 in Pre-K–3) and
Pennsauken High School (1,317; 9–12). Beginning in 1972, Merchantville sent its students to attend the Pennsauken district's high school as part of a sending/receiving relationship with the Merchantville School District; the Merchantville district has sought to end the relationship with the Pennsauken school and send its students to Haddon Heights High School. From 2015 to 2019 Merchantville was phased out of the Pennsauken High School.

Also available in the township is the Pennsauken Technical High School, which offers day and evening technical and vocational education to students from across the county.

Eustace Preparatory School is a coeducational, private high school for students in grades 9–12, founded in 1954 by the priests and brothers of the Society of the Catholic Apostolate (the Pallottines). Established in 1927, St. Cecilia School is a K–8 elementary school that operates under the auspices of the Roman Catholic Diocese of Camden. St. Cecilia operates jointly with a group of schools in Camden in the Catholic Partnership Schools, a post-parochial model of Urban Catholic Education.

Transportation

Roads and highways

Major roads through the township include Route 130, the largest highway through the township, which intersects with Route 73 in the northern part of the township, near the Cinnaminson Township border.  Route 90 is a short highway leading to the Betsy Ross Bridge, which connects the township with Philadelphia. Owned and operated by the Delaware River Port Authority, the bridge stretches  between abutments and opened to traffic on April 30, 1976. New Jersey Route 38 and Route 70 merge westbound in the eastern part of the township near the Cherry Hill border and U.S. Route 30 at the border with Camden. US 130 and 30 and NJ 38 and 70 converge at the Airport Circle in the southern section of Pennsauken Township.

CR 537 passes through in the south while CR 543 travels through in the north.

Public transportation
The township hosts three NJ Transit rail stops. The Pennsauken-Route 73 and 36th Street stations on the River Line offer service between Trenton and Camden. The Pennsauken Transit Center on River Road features a transfer between the River Line and the Atlantic City Line, which provides rail service between Atlantic City and Philadelphia. The station was constructed at a cost of $40 million and opened for commuters in October 2013.

Daily NJ Transit bus service between the township and Philadelphia is available on routes 317, 404, 406, and 409. Additional service to Philadelphia is available through routes 414 and 417, which run on weekdays during morning and evening rush hours. The township is also serviced by intrastate or
local routes 405, 407, 413, and 419, as well as express route 418.

Notable people

People who were born in, residents of, or otherwise closely associated with Pennsauken Township include:

 Harold Amos (1918–2003), microbiologist and professor, who was the first black department chairman at Harvard Medical School
 Dotty Attie (born 1938), feminist painter and printmaker whose works are in the collections of The Museum of Modern Art, The Whitney Museum, and the Brooklyn Museum
 Albert E. Burling (1891–1960), Justice of the New Jersey Supreme Court from 1947 to 1960
 Bill Conaty (born 1973), former professional American football player who played center for nine seasons for the Buffalo Bills, Minnesota Vikings, Dallas Cowboys, and the Arizona Cardinals.
 Jack Conners (born 1943), member of the New Jersey General Assembly from 1998 to 2011
 Mary Keating Croce (1928–2016), politician who served in the New Jersey General Assembly for three two-year terms, from 1974 to 1980, before serving as the Chairwoman of the New Jersey State Parole Board in the 1990s
 Ron Curry (born 1993), professional basketball player for Krka of the Premier A Slovenian Basketball League
 Eric Dezenhall (born 1962), crisis management consultant and author
 George Dempsey (1929–2017), former professional basketball player who played five seasons (1954–1959) in the National Basketball Association as a member of the Philadelphia Warriors and Syracuse Nationals
 Vice Admiral Nanette M. DeRenzi, 42nd Judge Advocate General (JAG) of the United States Navy
 Al Fisher (born 1986), basketball player for Kent State University who was named 2008 MAC PLayer of the Year
 Carmen M. Garcia, former Chief judge of Municipal Court in Trenton, New Jersey
 Bill Gosper (born 1943), mathematician and pioneering computer programmer
 David Griggs (1967–1995), former NFL linebacker
 Dwight Hicks (born 1956), former player for the San Francisco 49ers
 Todd McNair (born 1965), former NFL running back who played for the Kansas City Chiefs and Houston Oilers
 Bill Melchionni (born 1944), former National Basketball Association and American Basketball Association player
 Donald Norcross (born 1958), politician who has represented New Jersey's 1st congressional district since 2014, prior to which he served in the New Jersey General Assembly
 Delia Parr, author of historical fiction
 Steven M. Petrillo (born 1958), politician who served in the New Jersey General Assembly from 1994 to 1996
 Gary Schaer (born 1951), Council President of Passaic who represents the 36th Legislative District in the New Jersey General Assembly
 Frank Seward (1921–2004), pitcher who played for the New York Giants in 1943 and 1944
 Stephen M. Sweeney (born 1959), New Jersey State Senator (2002-2021) in the 3rd Legislative District and served as Senate President
 John Taylor (born 1962), wide receiver with the San Francisco 49ers
 Keith Taylor (born 1964), former NFL safety who played for the Indianapolis Colts, New Orleans Saints and Washington Redskins
 Jersey Joe Walcott (1914–1994), world heavyweight boxing champion from 1949 to 1952
 William Wesley (born 1964), NBA basketball player associate

References

External links

 Pennsauken Township website
 Pennsauken Public Schools
 
 School Data for the Pennsauken Public Schools, National Center for Education Statistics
 Griffith Morgan House

 
1892 establishments in New Jersey
Populated places established in 1892
Township form of New Jersey government
Townships in Camden County, New Jersey
New Jersey populated places on the Delaware River